Pethia expletiforis is a species of cyprinid fish native to India where it is found in streams in Mizoram, India.  This species can reach a length of  SL.

References 

Pethia
Fish of India
Fish described in 2013